Kim McCraw (born ) is a Canadian film producer and co-founder of the Montreal-based production company micro_scope, with Luc Déry.

She was born in Granby, Quebec, and after graduating from Cégep de Granby became a director's assistant.

McCraw met Dery while working on a short film in Granby. It was in 2004 that she joined the micro_scope team as a producer, and subsequently became a co-shareholder. With Dery, McCraw specialized in "smart, high-end pics designed to attract interest outside Canada". Their films Incendies (2010) and Monsieur Lazhar (2011) both won the Genie Award for Best Motion Picture, and both were nominated for the Academy Award for Best Foreign Language Film. McCraw co-produced Inch'Allah and personally went to Jordan to work on the film. She later produced Gabrielle (2013), which competed at the Locarno Film Festival.

Filmography 
Her films include: 

 Familia - 2005
 Congorama - 2006
 Continental, a Film Without Guns (Continental, un film sans fusil) - 2007
 It's Not Me, I Swear! (C'est pas moi, je le jure!) - 2008
 Incendies - 2010
 Monsieur Lazhar - 2011
 Familiar Grounds - 2011
 Inch'Allah - 2012
 Enemy - 2013
 You're Sleeping Nicole (Tu dors Nicole) - 2014
 My Internship in Canada (Guibord s'en va-t-en guerre) - 2015
 Allure - 2017
 For Those Who Don't Read Me (À tous ceux qui ne me lisent pas) - 2018
 My Salinger Year - 2020
 Drunken Birds (Les Oiseaux ivres) - 2021
 The Origin of Evil (L'Origine du mal) - 2022

References

Film producers from Quebec
Canadian women film producers
Canadian Screen Award winners
Living people
People from Granby, Quebec
Year of birth uncertain
Year of birth missing (living people)